Valentin Kuzmin (4 January 1941 – 2008) was a Russian butterfly swimmer who won one silver and three gold medals at the European championships in 1962 and 1966. He competed in four events at the 1960, 1964 and 1968 Summer Olympics and finished in seventh, fifth and fourth place in the 200 m butterfly event, respectively. His team was also fourth in the 4 × 100 m medley relay in 1964.

Between 1962 and 1966 he set seven European records, four in the 200 m butterfly and three in the 4 × 100 m medley relay. During 1959–1966 he also set 24 national records and won 20 national titles in butterfly and medley events.

After retirement from senior swimming he competed in the masters category and won two national titles in 1989. He had a PhD in economical sciences and was a professor at the Moscow State University. Between 1989 and 2005 he worked in Chile with the United Nations. After returning to Russia he took part in European championships in Sweden.

References

1941 births
2008 deaths
Russian male swimmers
Male butterfly swimmers
Olympic swimmers of the Soviet Union
Swimmers at the 1960 Summer Olympics
Swimmers at the 1964 Summer Olympics
Swimmers at the 1968 Summer Olympics
European Aquatics Championships medalists in swimming
Universiade medalists in swimming
Universiade gold medalists for the Soviet Union
Medalists at the 1963 Summer Universiade
Medalists at the 1965 Summer Universiade
Soviet male swimmers